M1A1, M1-A1, M1 A1, or M-1A1 may refer to:

Military
 M1A1 Flamethrower, an anti-personnel weapon
 an anti-aircraft 90 mm gun
 a U.S. Army bangalore torpedo used in World War II
 a variant of the M1 Abrams battle tank
 a variant of the M1 carbine with a folding stock for paratroopers
 a variant of the Thompson submachine gun
 a variant of the Bazooka rocket launcher

Other
 a port of Marathon (computer game)
 a song by Gorillaz on Gorillaz (album)
 a clothing label founded in New Zealand M1A1 clothing division
 a road built to link two major motorways in Yorkshire, England, known during construction as M1 A1 Link